Ahmed Reda Tagnaouti (born 5 April 1996) is a Moroccan professional footballer who plays as goalkeeper for Botola club Wydad AC and the Morocco national team.

International career 
In May 2018, Tagnaouti was named in Morocco's 23-man squad for the 2018 FIFA World Cup in Russia.

On 10 November 2022, he was named in Morocco's 23-man squad for the 2022 FIFA World Cup in Qatar.

Career statistics

Honours
IR Tanger 
Moroccan League : 2017–18 

Wydad AC
Moroccan League : 2016–17, 2018–19, 2020–21, 2021–22
CAF Champions League :  2021-22 

Morocco
African Nations Championship: 2018

Individual
 Best goalkeeper in Moroccan League: 2018–19
 Best goalkeeper in CAF Champions League : 2022

References

External links

Living people
1996 births
People from Fez, Morocco
Moroccan footballers
Association football goalkeepers
Morocco international footballers
Morocco A' international footballers
2018 FIFA World Cup players
2018 African Nations Championship players
2019 Africa Cup of Nations players
2021 Africa Cup of Nations players
2022 FIFA World Cup players
Botola players
RS Berkane players
Wydad AC players
Ittihad Tanger players